I'm an Elephant, Madame is a 1969 West German drama film directed by Peter Zadek. It was entered into the 19th Berlin International Film Festival, where it won a Silver Bear award.

Cast

References

External links
 

1969 films
1969 drama films
German drama films
West German films
1960s German-language films
Films directed by Peter Zadek
Films set in schools
1960s German films